The ASV Hollfeld is a German association football club from the town of Hollfeld, Bavaria.

The club's greatest success came in 2012 when it qualified for the new northern division of the expanded Bayernliga, the fifth tier of the German football league system, where it played for two seasons until 2014.

History
For most of its history the club has been a non-descript amateur side in local Bavarian football, on occasion rising as far as the Bezirksliga. The club was originally formed as the gymnastics club TV Hollfeld in June 1900 but changed to its current name in 1929 when a football department was established. The club's rise through the divisions began in the mid-2000s. In 2006 it earned promotion to the tier seven Bezirksliga Oberfranken-Ost where it finished champions in its first season there and won promotion to the Bezirksoberliga.

Playing in the Bezirksoberliga Oberfranken in 2007–08 the club finished runners-up in the league was promoted to the Landesliga.

ASV Hollfeld played for the next four seasons in the Landesliga Bayern-Nord until this league was disbanded in 2012. In the Landesliga the club finished on all occasions in the lower half of the table. However, a fourteenth place was enough to qualify the club for the new northern division of the Bayernliga after success in the promotion round, overcoming SV Friesen and TSV Neudrossenfeld in the process.

Hollfeld played for two seasons in the Bayernliga Nord, coming fourteenth in its first year. An eighteenth place in the second season meant the club was relegated and forced to step down to the Landesliga Bayern-Nordost. In the Landesliga, in 2014–15, the club finished last in the league and was relegated once more, now to the Bezirksliga. A last-place finish in the Bezirksliga in 2015–16 meant another drop for the club, now to the A-Klasse, which Bayreuth won for the first time in 2019, climbing them up to the Bezirksliga once more.

Honours
The club's honours:
 Bezirksoberliga Oberfranken
 Runners-up: 2008
 Bezirksliga Oberfranken-Ost
 Champions: 2007
 A-Klasse Bayreuth
 Champions: 2019
 Runners-up: 2006
 Kreisklasse Bayreuth 1
 Runners-up: 2005

Recent seasons
The recent season-by-season performance of the club:

With the introduction of the Bezirksoberligas in 1988 as the new fifth tier, below the Landesligas, all leagues below dropped one tier. With the introduction of the Regionalligas in 1994 and the 3. Liga in 2008 as the new third tier, below the 2. Bundesliga, all leagues below dropped one tier. With the establishment of the Regionalliga Bayern as the new fourth tier in Bavaria in 2012 the Bayernliga was split into a northern and a southern division, the number of Landesligas expanded from three to five and the Bezirksoberligas abolished. All leagues from the Bezirksligas onwards were elevated one tier.

Key

References

External links
 Official team site  
 Das deutsche Fußball-Archiv  historical German domestic league tables
 Manfreds Fussball Archiv  Tables and results from the Bavarian amateur leagues

Football clubs in Germany
Football clubs in Bavaria
Football in Upper Franconia
Association football clubs established in 1929
Sports clubs established in 1900
1900 establishments in Germany